The 1898 Connecticut gubernatorial election was held on November 8, 1898. Republican nominee George E. Lounsbury defeated Democratic nominee Daniel N. Morgan with 54.17% of the vote.

General election

Candidates
Major party candidates
George E. Lounsbury, Republican
Daniel N. Morgan, Democratic

Other candidates
Charles Stodel, Socialist Labor
Charles E. Steele, Prohibition

Results

References

1898
Connecticut
Gubernatorial